The Lupata Group is an Aptian geologic group in the Tete Province of Mozambique and the Northern Region of Malawi. The group contains the Dinosaur Beds, a fossiliferous unit in Malawi that has provided dinosaur remains.

Fossil content 
The following fossils have been reported from the formation:

 Karongasaurus gittelmani
 Malawisaurus dixeyi
 Malawisuchus mwakasyungutiensis
 Platycheloides nyasae
 aff. Araripesuchus sp.
 Anura indet.
 Crocodylia indet.
 Theropoda indet.
 Titanosauridae indet.
 Teleostei indet.

See also 
 List of dinosaur-bearing rock formations
 List of stratigraphic units with indeterminate dinosaur fossils

References

Bibliography 
 Weishampel, David B.; Dodson, Peter; and Osmólska, Halszka (eds.): The Dinosauria, 2nd, Berkeley: University of California Press. 861 pp.

Further reading 
 L. L. Jacobs, D. A. Winkler, Z.M. Kaufulu and W.R. Downs. 1990. The Dinosaur Beds of northern Malawi, Africa. National Geographic Research 6(2):196-204
 F. Dixey and W. C. Smith. 1929. The rocks of the Lupata Gorge and the north side of the Lower Zambezi. Geological Magazine 66(6):241-259

Geologic groups of Africa
Geologic formations of Malawi
Geologic formations of Mozambique
Lower Cretaceous Series of Africa
Cretaceous Mozambique
Aptian Stage
Mudstone formations
Sandstone formations
Shale formations
Marl formations
Fluvial deposits
Lacustrine deposits
Paleontology in Malawi
Paleontology in Mozambique
Formations
Formations